Frank Campbell Biggs (September 13, 1872 – March 27, 1942) was a United Farmers of Ontario member of the Legislative Assembly of Ontario who represented Wentworth North from 1919 to 1926. He served in the cabinet for the Ernest Charles Drury Coalition government from 1919 to 1923 as Minister of Public Works and Minister of Public Highways.

Biggs was a farmer, the son of Richard L. Biggs (1847–1925) and Ella A. Howell (1885–1932), and was educated in Dundas, Guelph and Hamilton.

Biggs served as warden for Wentworth County and reeve for Beverly Township, Ontario.

He raised cattle and was a director of the Wentworth Agricultural Society.

Biggs was said to be the first in the county to have used electric milking and cooling machines.

As Minister of Highways, he initiated the development of the province's system of paved highways.

His uncle Samuel Clarke Biggs was a member of the Manitoba legislature.

Biggs left the Legislature in 1926 and died in Redlands, California in 1942.

He is interred at Mount Zion Cemetery in Beverly Township, Wentworth County, Ontario with his wife Beulah Howell (1885–1965).

Cabinet posts

References 

 Canadian Parliamentary Guide, 1922, EJ Chambers

External links 

Ancaster's Heritage (1973)

1872 births
1942 deaths
Members of the Executive Council of Ontario
Politicians from Brantford
United Farmers of Ontario MLAs